La Rouge is the third release of the Montreal-based instrumental act Torngat.

Track listing
 "Nouvelle France"
 "Bell Duet"
 "Alberta Song"
 "La Rouge"
 "Bye Bye Sly"

2005 albums
Torngat albums